The 1987 World Women's Curling Championship was held in Chicago, Illinois from March 22–28, 1987.

Teams

Round-robin standings

Tiebreakers
 6-5 
 7-6 
 7-6 
 7-1

Playoffs

References

World Women's Curling Championship
Ford World Women's Curling Championship
Sports competitions in Chicago
United States
March 1987 sports events in the United States
1980s in Chicago
1987 in Illinois
International curling competitions hosted by the United States
Curling in Illinois